John Gilligan (born 2 May 1957 in Abingdon, Oxfordshire) is an English former professional footballer who played as a midfielder in the English Football League for Swindon Town, Huddersfield Town and Northampton Town, and in Ireland for Sligo Rovers.

References

1957 births
Living people
People from Abingdon-on-Thames
English footballers
Association football midfielders
Swindon Town F.C. players
Huddersfield Town A.F.C. players
Northampton Town F.C. players
Sligo Rovers F.C. players
English Football League players
League of Ireland players